Portrait of a Gentleman may refer to:

 Portrait of a Gentleman (El Greco) by El Greco
 Portrait of a Gentleman (Lotto) by Lorenzo Lotto
 Portrait of a Gentleman (Maíno) by Juan Bautista Maíno
 Portrait of a Gentleman (Mellin) by Claude Mellin
 Portrait of a Gentleman (Melone) by Altobello Melone
 Portrait of a Gentleman, Isaak Abrahamsz Massa by Frans Hals
 Portrait of a Gentleman Skating by Gilbert Stuart
 Portrait of a Gentleman Wearing Lynx Fur by Paolo Veronese
 Portrait of a Gentleman in a Fur by Paolo Veronese
 Portrait of a Gentleman with a Letter by Moretto da Brescia
 Portrait of a Gentleman with a Lion Paw by Lorenzo Lotto

See also
 Portrait of a Man (disambiguation)
 Portrait of a Young Man (disambiguation)
 Portrait of a Lady (disambiguation)